LA-35 is a constituency of Azad Kashmir Legislative Assembly which is currently represented by Maqbool Ahmad of Pakistan Tehreek-e-Insaf. It covers the area of Hafizabad District Gujranwala District (except Wazirabad Tehsil) Sialkot District (except Sialkot Tehsil in Pakistan. Only refugees from Jammu and Ladakh settled in Pakistan are eligible to vote.

Election 2016

elections were held in this constituency on 21 July 2016.

Election 2021 
Further information: Azad Kashmir Election 2021

Maqbool Ahmad of Pakistan Tehreek-e-Insaf won the seat by getting 18,934 votes.

Azad Kashmir Legislative Assembly constituencies